Wingstop Inc. is an American multinational chain of aviation-themed restaurants specializing in chicken wings. Wingstop locations follow a 1930s and 1940s pre-jet aviation theme.  
 
The restaurant chain was founded in 1994 in Garland, Texas, and began offering franchises in 1997. As of 2022, Wingstop now has over 1,400 restaurants.  The chain is headquartered in Addison, Texas.

In 2003, the chain was acquired by Gemini Investors, which sold it to Roark Capital Group in 2010. Wingstop went public in 2015.

History
Wingstop was founded in 1994 in Garland, Texas by Antonio Swad. The first franchised location opened in 1997, and by 2002 the brand claimed to have served two million wings.

In 2005, Wingstop opened its doors for lunch and in 2009 rolled out its boneless product.

Wingstop went global in 2010 with its first international restaurant opening in Mexico. It currently operates in nine countries.

Wingstop was the third-fastest-growing restaurant chain in the US from 2014 and 2016 as measured by both systemwide sales and unit growth, according to Nation's Restaurant News. 

In 2015, Wingstop went public at an initial public offering price of $19 per share. That year, the franchise's profits more than doubled.

In 2019, Wingstop unveiled the tagline Where Flavor Gets Its Wings. The next year, Wingstop launched national delivery with DoorDash and celebrated 25 years in business.

Menu

The menu consists of chicken wings, boneless wings, chicken sandwiches, and chicken tenders with various dips and sides. The flavor's available in the US include plain, Hawaiian, Garlic Parmesan, Lemon Pepper, Mild, Original Hot, Hickory Smoked BBQ, Atomic, Mango Habanero, Cajun, Louisiana Rub, and Spicy Korean Q. In August 2022, the restaurant chain introduced chicken sandwiches which come in the same  flavors that the wings are available in.

Previous U.S. market limited time offer flavors include Brazilian Citrus Pepper, Harissa Lemon Pepper, Ancho Honey Glaze, and "flavor mashups" consisting of a mix of two existing flavors during the brand's 25 Days of Flavor campaign in 2019, including Hot Lemon, Dragon's Breath, and more. In 2021, Wingstop brought back Hot Lemon, Lemon Garlic, and Bayou BBQ for a limited time.

Wingstop Charities 
Wingstop Charities are focused toward youth and their passions, ranging from education, arts, sports, career development and more. 

The Wingstop Team Member Foundation is funded by employees and provides direct support to team members experiencing a financial hardship due to an emergency.

Locations

Wingstop opened its first international location in Mexico in 2011, where it now counts 21 locations. As of 2022, Wingstop has locations in the United States, Canada, France, Indonesia, Mexico, Singapore, Spain, United Arab Emirates and United Kingdom.

ThighStop 
On June 21, 2021, WingStop announced a digital-only restaurant called ThighStop, which includes the same menu items as WingStop, but sells thighs instead of wings. The company cited cost-saving measures as the reason for the change.

See also

 List of chicken restaurants

References

External links
 

Regional restaurant chains in the United States
Restaurants established in 1994
Restaurants in Texas
Theme restaurants
Companies based in Richardson, Texas
1994 establishments in Texas
Fast-food chains of the United States
Poultry restaurants
Companies listed on the Nasdaq
2015 initial public offerings
2003 mergers and acquisitions
2010 mergers and acquisitions
Chicken chains of the United States